LBC Nagham was a Lebanese musical television channel and is LBC Group's musical brand. Launched in 2003, as the brand's name (nağam) suggests, it is one of the first specialised music channels launched in the region.

See also
 LBC

References

2003 establishments in Lebanon
Television channels and stations established in 2003
International broadcasters
Television networks in Lebanon
Television stations in Lebanon
Arab mass media
Arabic-language television stations